The  was a Japanese aristocratic kin group (uji) that supposedly existed during the Kofun period.

History
The Katsuragi clan was founded by Katsuragi no Sotsuhiko (葛城襲津彦), a great-grandson of the legendary Emperor Kōgen. During the 5th century the clan was the most prominent power in the court and intermarried with the imperial family. After the Katsuragi declined in the late 5th century, the Ōtomo clan temporarily took its place. When Emperor Buretsu died with no apparent heir, it was Ōtomo no Kanamura who recommended Emperor Keitai, a very distant imperial relative who resided in Koshi Province, as the new monarch. However, Kanamura resigned due to the failure of his diplomatic policies, and the court was eventually controlled by the Mononobe and Soga clans at the beginning of the Asuka period.

Family Tree
Emperor Kōgen (孝元天皇, 273BC–158BC)
Hikofutsuoshinomakoto-no-mikoto (彦太忍信命, ?–?)
Yanushioshiotakeogokoro-no-mikoto (屋主忍男武雄心命, ?–?)
Takenouchi no Sukune (武内宿禰, ?–?)
Katsuragi no Sotsuhiko (葛城襲津彦, ?–?)
Katsuragi no Tamada no Sukune (葛城玉田宿禰, ?–416)
Katsuragi no Tsubura no Ōomi (葛城円大臣)
Katsuragi no Karahime (葛城韓媛), wife of Emperor Yūryaku
Katsuragi no Kehime (葛城毛媛), wife of Kibi no Tasa (吉備田狭)
Iwa-no-hime-no-mikoto (磐之媛命), empress of Emperor Nintoku
Katsuragi no Ashida no Sukune (葛城葦田宿禰)
Katsuragi no Ari no Omi (葛城蟻臣)
Hae-hime (荑媛), wife of Ichinobe-no-Oshiwa-no-miko, crown prince of Emperor Richū
Kuro-hime (黒媛), empress of Emperor Richū
Katsuragi no Koshimo no Sukune (葛城腰裾宿禰)
Katsuragi no Ikuha no Toda no Sukune (的戸田宿禰)
Kumamichi no Tarine (熊道足禰)
name unknown
name unknown
Unakami no Sukune (菟上足尼)

See also
Kofun period
Soga clan
Nakatomi clan
Mononobe clan

References

Kofun period
Japanese clans